The Tales of Robin Hood was from May 1989 to February 2009 an indoor visitor attraction and medieval banqueting centre based on the Nottinghamshire legend of Robin Hood. The centre was located on Maid Marian Way in Nottingham City Centre, in the vicinity of Nottingham Castle, and brought an estimated £2 million in tourism revenue to the city each year.

Visitors were taken on a chair-lift ride through a recreation of medieval Nottingham with its sights, sounds and smells in addition to Robin Hood's hideout in Sherwood Forest.

Archery and brass rubbing were also on offer and a cinema show investigated the legend of Robin Hood. The centre's 'Great Hall' offered medieval banquets through the year.

The attraction was forced to close in February 2009, after being open for nearly 20 years, due to difficulties with rent payments to its landlord, Tesco.

References

Robin Hood
Nottingham
Defunct tourist attractions in Nottinghamshire
1989 establishments in England
2009 disestablishments in England